The 1939 Cork Intermediate Hurling Championship was the 30th staging of the Cork Intermediate Hurling Championship since its establishment by the Cork County Board in 1909. The draw for the opening round fixtures took place on 29 January 1939. The championship began on 23 April 1939 and ended on 13 August 1939.

On 13 August 1939, Ballincollig won the championship following a 4-06 to 4-02 defeat of Ballinora in the final at the Mardyke. This was their fifth championship title overall and their first title since 1935.

Results

First round

 Lough Rovers received a bye in this round.

Second round

Semi-finals

Final

Championship statistics

Miscellaneous

 Brian Dillons and Buttevant were eliminated from the championship, in spite of winning their opening games, after objections from the defeated teams were upheld by the County Board.

References

Cork Intermediate Hurling Championship
Cork Intermediate Hurling Championship